Warner Park is a community park on the northeast side of Madison, Wisconsin near Lake Mendota.

Warner Park is also the home to the Madison Mallards baseball team, a member of the Northwoods League. Its stadium, nicknamed the "Duck Pond", was built in 1982 and has a capacity of 6,750. It also hosts the Madison East High School and Madison La Follette High School baseball teams.

The adjacent football field was formerly the home of the Madison Mustangs, a semi-professional football team that played in the Central States Football League in the 1960s and 1970s.

Warner Park contains a multi-purpose facility for community activities. It has a gymnasium, a fully equipped exercise room, a game room and dry and wet craft rooms. Meeting rooms and community rooms are available for rent.

The park contains a 9-foot-tall metal replica of the Statue of Liberty (Liberty Enlightening the World), built in 1950.

See also
 Replicas of the Statue of Liberty

References

External links
Official website
Ballpark Digest visit to Warner Park

Parks in Wisconsin
Geography of Madison, Wisconsin
Sports venues in Madison, Wisconsin
Protected areas of Dane County, Wisconsin
Tourist attractions in Madison, Wisconsin
Defunct National Premier Soccer League stadiums
Sports venues completed in 1982
1982 establishments in Wisconsin
Defunct Midwest League ballparks